is a village located in Miyake Subprefecture, Tokyo Metropolis, Japan. , the village had an estimated population of 2,415, and a population density of 44.3 persons per km2.

Geography

Neighboring municipalities
Tokyo Metropolis
Hachijō, Tokyo
Kōzushima, Tokyo

History
It is uncertain when human settlement first began on Miyakejima, but the island was known to be inhabited since at least in the early Nara period, and is mentioned in historical records for its many volcanic eruptions. The island was used as a penal colony during the Edo period.  After the start of the Meiji period, in 1878, the island came under the control of Tokyo-fu and was organized into five villages (Izu, Kamitsuki, Igaya, Ako and Tsubota) under Oshima subprefecture on October 1, 1923. Miyake subprefecture was created out of Oshima subprefecture on April 1, 1943.

On August 31, 1945, during the Allies' occupation of Tokyo, ground gunners on Miyake-jima fired three shots at an American transport aircraft, with no casualties. These were to be amongst the last shots fired in the war.

The three villages of Izu, Kamitsuki and Igaya merged on October 1, 1946, to form the village of Miyake, which was joined by Abo and Tsubota on February 1, 1956. The village was evacuated in the year 2000 due to volcanic eruptions, and the inhabitants were only allowed to return from 2005.

Economy
Fishing and seasonal tourism are the mainstays of the economy of Miyake.

Transportation

Airport
Miyakejima Airport

Education
Miyake village operates a public elementary, Miyake Elementary School (村立三宅小学校), and a public junior high school, Miyake Junior High School (村立三宅中学校).

The Tokyo Metropolitan Board of Education operates one high school, Miyake High School.

Local attractions
 Miyake is famous for its traditional taiko performances, known as kamitsuki kiyari taiko,

References

External links

Miyake Village Official Website 

Villages of Tokyo
Populated coastal places in Japan